The Church of St Andrew in Curry Rivel, Somerset, England dates from the 13th century and is designated as a Grade I listed building. It was included in Simon Jenkins England's Thousand Best Churches.

The oldest part of the church is the north chapel which is Norman, however there may have been an earlier Saxon church on the same site. Most of the church is from the 15th century. An earlier tower was demolished and rebuilt in 1861 when the interior was also refashioned. Within the tower are eight bells, the oldest of which is from 1510.

The interior includes several 13th century monuments and a parclose screen.

The Anglican parish is within the benefice of Curry Rivel with Fivehead and Swell, within the Taunton archdeaconry.

See also

 List of Grade I listed buildings in South Somerset
 List of towers in Somerset
 List of ecclesiastical parishes in the Diocese of Bath and Wells

References

13th-century church buildings in England
Church of England church buildings in South Somerset
Grade I listed churches in Somerset
Grade I listed buildings in South Somerset